Ashton Chen or Chen Yong Zhao (Chinese: 陈勇肇, born 9 September 1989) is a Singaporean retired badminton player and a former national champion.

Career 
Chen was part of the South East Asian Games men's team that won silver medal in the 2007 edition and bronze medals in the 2009, 2011 editions. In 2012, he won the men's singles title at the Singaporean National Badminton Championships. At the BWF event tournaments, he has won the men's singles title at the 2007 Waikato and 2011 Smiling Fish Thailand International tournament, and in the men's doubles, he won the 2011 Maldives International tournament. Chen quits the national team on 11 April 2014 after playing his final game for Singapore in the Djarum Superliga 2014 tournament.

Personal life 

Chen pleaded guilty for having sexual contact with a young 13-year-old girl and was sentenced to 28 months in jail.

Achievements

BWF International Challenge/Series
Men's singles

Men's doubles

 BWF International Challenge tournament
 BWF International Series tournament

References

External links 
 

1989 births
Living people
Place of birth missing (living people)
Singaporean male badminton players
Badminton players at the 2010 Commonwealth Games
Commonwealth Games competitors for Singapore
Competitors at the 2007 Southeast Asian Games
Competitors at the 2009 Southeast Asian Games
Competitors at the 2011 Southeast Asian Games
Southeast Asian Games silver medalists for Singapore
Southeast Asian Games bronze medalists for Singapore
Southeast Asian Games medalists in badminton